Caicay District is one of six districts of the province Paucartambo in Peru.

Geography 
The most important river of the district is the Willkanuta which flows along the western border of the district.

Ethnic groups 
The people in the district are mainly indigenous citizens of Quechua descent. Quechua is the language which the majority of the population (86.07%) learnt to speak in childhood, 13.32% of the residents started speaking using the Spanish language (2007 Peru Census).

See also 
 Pumakancha
 P'unquchayuq
 Quri
 Tawqa

References